Neil McIntosh may refer to:

 Neil McIntosh (footballer) (1920–1995), Australian rules footballer
 Neil McIntosh (journalist) (born 1974), Scottish managing editor of BBC Online
 Neil McIntosh (paediatrician) (born 1942), Scottish paediatrician and neonatologist
 Neil McIntosh (public administrator) (born 1940), Scottish civil servant